Chantal Hoffmann (born 30 October 1987) is a Luxembourgian former road cyclist, who rode professionally between 2014 and 2019, entirely for the  team. She participated at the 2011 UCI Road World Championships and at the 2016 Summer Olympics in Rio de Janeiro.

Major results
Source: 

2013
 3rd  Road race, Games of the Small States of Europe
 National Road Championships
3rd Road race
3rd Time trial
2014
 National Road Championships
2nd Road race
2nd Time trial
2015
 National Road Championships
3rd Road race
3rd Time trial
2016
 2nd Road race, National Road Championships
2017
 Games of the Small States of Europe
1st  Team road race
7th Road race
 3rd Time trial, National Road Championships
 10th 7-Dorpenomloop Aalburg
2019
 2nd Road race, National Road Championships

References

External links
 
 

1987 births
Luxembourgian female cyclists
Living people
Place of birth missing (living people)
Cyclists at the 2016 Summer Olympics
Olympic cyclists of Luxembourg
European Games competitors for Luxembourg
Cyclists at the 2019 European Games